Lake Frierson State Park is a  Arkansas state park on Crowley's Ridge in Greene County, eastern Arkansas.

Containing a  reservoir built by the Soil Conservation Service, the park entered the system in 1975. The park skirts the Crowley's Ridge formation and offers fishing as well as hiking, camping, kayaking, and a visitor center.

In addition to the recreation opportunities at Lake Frierson, the area is home to a unique blend of forests in the state. Located partially in a forest similar to those found in the Appalachians, the park also contains the oak-hickory forest native to the Ozarks and a wide variety of rare trees in Arkansas on Crowley's Ridge's northern slopes, including the cucumber tree, northern red oak and tulip tree.

History
In the 1970s, the Soil Conservation Service (now known as Natural Resources Conservation Service or NRCS) constructed ten dams along the western edge of Crowley's Ridge in northeast Arkansas. A lawyer from Jonesboro named Charles Frierson was instrumental in acquiring the property as a state park. The site officially became a state park when funding was approved by the Arkansas General Assembly in 1975. Although initially only a day-use park, Lake Frierson has grown to a full service park with visitor center and camping facilities.

Recreation

Camping is available in four class C and three class D campsites on the east side of the lake. Picnic areas are scattered throughout the park, and an air-conditioned and heated pavilion with room for 80 attendees is available for rent. Fishing for bream, catfish, crappie, and bass is available in the timber-filled Lake Frierson. Non-motor fishing boats and pedal boats are available for rent, and bait, fishing and camping supplies and gifts can be purchased at the visitor center. Visitors are also able to hike along the circular  Dogwood Lane Trail, a self-guided interpretative trail.

See also

References

State parks of Arkansas
Crowley's Ridge
Protected areas of Greene County, Arkansas
Protected areas established in 1975
Bodies of water of Greene County, Arkansas
Frierson
1975 establishments in Arkansas